Jalal Hosseini (1927 – July 21, 2010) is the founder and former leader of the Khabat organization.

Biography 
Hosseini was born in 1927 in Baneh. He is the second son of Salih and brother of Ezaddin Husseini. He began his education in Mukriyan. There, he studied with his brother Ezaddin and many other Kurdish religious scholars. He received his mullah's license from Mullah Baqir in Durwa. He later became the leader of Zhekaf Sheikh Jalal Association. Many teachers become religious teachers under his leadership. In addition to teaching about Sunni Islam, he added Kurdology to the curriculum. During the Iranian Revolution, Hosseini became one of the leaders of the demonstrations against the the Shah's regime in Kurdistan. After the victory of the revolution, Hosseini also reacted against Khomeini because he believed that Khomeini would not fulfill his promises regarding Kurdish rights. He encouraged the Kurds to continue their struggle against their enemies. After the Khomeini regime's attack on Kurdistan, he founded the Khabat Organization on June 20, 1980, to continue his struggle. The establishment of this organization with a national and Islamic belief had an impact on the Kurds in Iran. In a short time, it opened its branches and headquarters in several cities. Khabat took up arms, fighting alongside PJAK against Iran despite their major ideological differences. Hosseini's sons participated in the battlefields. One of his sons, Abdul Karim Hosseini, was killed in a battle against Iranian forces. Hosseini was a religious and political figure, but he also had a good ability in poetry and book writing. He only published only one book during his lifetime. Until 2004, he was the leader and secretary general of the Khabat Organization. He died on July 21, 2010, in a hospital in Erbil, Kurdistan Region.

References 

Kurdish people
Iranian Kurdistan
People from Baneh
1927 births
2010 deaths